Hichem Kaabi (born ) is a Tunisian male volleyball player. He is part of the Tunisia men's national volleyball team. He competed with the national team at the 2012 Summer Olympics in London, Great Britain. He played with E.S. Tunis in 2012.

Clubs
  E.S. Tunis (2012)

See also
 Tunisia at the 2012 Summer Olympics

References

1986 births
Living people
Tunisian men's volleyball players
Place of birth missing (living people)
Volleyball players at the 2012 Summer Olympics
Olympic volleyball players of Tunisia